Guerrilla: The Taking of Patty Hearst is a 2004 PBS documentary film about the 1974 kidnapping of Patty Hearst by the Symbionese Liberation Army left-wing revolutionary group. It was directed by Robert Stone, and features interviews with Timothy Findley and SLA members Russ Little and Michael Bortin.

Critical reception
The film was well received and, based on 46 reviews, has an approval rating of 87% on review aggregator website Rotten Tomatoes. The site's consensus reads: "Guerilla is a riveting documentary that chronicles in enlightening fashion the 1974 kidnapping of heiress Patty Hearst."

References

External links
 
 
 
 
 
 

2004 television films
2004 films
2004 documentary films
American documentary films
American Experience
Films about kidnapping
Films directed by Robert Stone
Documentary films about terrorism
Cultural depictions of Patty Hearst
2000s English-language films
2000s American films